Sapang Dalaga, officially the Municipality of Sapang Dalaga, is a 5th class municipality in the province of Misamis Occidental, Philippines. According to the 2020 census, it has a population of 20,490 people.

It is rich in mineral resources such as gold, copper and manganese, and has mountains, rivers, waterfalls and beaches. Baga (waterfalls in the native language) with its scenic beauty is a kilometer from the town center, can be reached by foot or motor vehicles.  Panoramic mountains such as Mount Dasa and Mount Pedoluan reside. Casul Bay which connects to Murcielagos Bay can be navigated.

Etymology

Its name is derived from the phrase sapa ng dalaga (ancient Visayan language dating back to the 14th century before Spanish colonization), meaning "maiden in a creek".

The names of some barangays were derived from rivers and trees, for example, Guinabot came from a river, Locus was derived from the native locus tree.

Geography

Climate

Barangays
Sapang Dalaga is politically subdivided into 28 barangays.

Demographics

Economy 

Its economy is based on agriculture, with root crops such as gabi, palaw, sweet potato, ube and apale. It has plantation of coconuts, lanzones, mangosteen, rambotan, marang, hibi (June plume), guyabano, santol, durian and native bananas. Herbal plants such as Salingkapao (tawa-tawa), buyo, dalapot (sambong) grows in each household plot. Vegetables such as string beans, squash, malunggay, likway, bago and sikwa can be found. Sea foods such as bongcawel, saang, bacase, king crabs, nukos (squid), lato (seaweeds), kitong, dangget, lapu-lapu, pasayan (prawn) can be bought every Friday (market day).

References

External links
 [ Philippine Standard Geographic Code]
Philippine Census Information
Local Governance Performance Management System
www.gmanews.tv/story, Sun.Star: History of violence in Sapang Dalaga

Municipalities of Misamis Occidental